X Trianguli Australis is a star in the southern constellation Triangulum Australe. It is a red-hued carbon star  approximately 920 light years (280 parsecs) from Earth, though this could vary by up to 200 light years.  It is a semi-regular variable star with two periods of around 385 and 455 days, and is of spectral type C5.5(Nb). It ranges from magnitudes 5.03 to 6.05. Its designation is from the variable star designation developed by German astronomer Friedrich Wilhelm Argelander.

It is a cool star, with estimates of its surface temperature ranging from 2,200 to 2,700 Kelvin. A giant star, its diameter is 400 times that of the sun, and if placed at the center of the Solar System would stretch out to 30% further than Mars' orbit. Its absolute magnitude is −2.0.

References

Carbon stars
Asymptotic-giant-branch stars
Slow irregular variables
Triangulum Australe
Durchmusterung objects
134453
074582
5644
Trianguli Australis, X